Monte Cervantes is a container ship owned by A.P. Moller Singapore Pte. Ltd. and operated by Maersk Line AS. Originally owned by Reederei Monte GmbH & Co KG, a subsidiary of Hamburg Süd, she has had two owners and been registered under three flags.

The vessel is one of ten ships of the Monte class built for Hamburg Süd by Daewoo Shipbuilding & Marine Engineering and Daewoo Mangalia Heavy Industries between 2004 and 2009.

Construction
Monte Cervantes had its keel laid down on 23 February 2004 at Daewoo Shipbuilding & Marine Engineering in Okpo, South Korea.

The ship's gross tonnage, a measure of the volume of all its enclosed spaces, is 69,132. Its net tonnage, which measures the volume of the cargo spaces, is 34,823.

The vessel was built with a HSD Engine Co. Ltd. 8RTA96C-B main engine, which drives a controllable-pitch propeller. The 8-cylinder engine has a Maximum Continuous Rating of 45,760 kW with 102 revolutions per minute at MCR. The cylinder bore is 960mm. The vessel's steam piping system features an Aalborg CH 8-500 auxiliary boiler.

Construction of the ship was completed on 28 July 2004.

Notes

Merchant ships
2004 ships